Pseudoloessa laosensis is a species of beetle in the family Cerambycidae. It was described by Stephan von Breuning in 1963. It is known from Laos.

References

Gyaritini
Beetles described in 1963
Taxa named by Stephan von Breuning (entomologist)